Monetaria moneta, common name the money cowrie, is a species of small sea snail, a marine gastropod mollusk in the family Cypraeidae, the cowries.

This species is called "money cowrie" because the shells were historically widely used in many Pacific and Indian Ocean countries as shell money before coinage was in common usage.

Description and characteristics 
The color is pale (from white to dirty beige), but the dorsum seems transparent, often greenish grey with yellowish margins, with sometimes darker transverse stripes and a delicate yellow ring. The opening is wide and white, with pronounced denticules. The mantle of the live animal is mottled with black and off-white.

The shell of Monetaria moneta varies widely in shape and color, with some of these varieties having been described as full species. As a result, this species has numerous taxonomic synonyms.

Distribution 

This is a very common species which is found widely in Indo-Pacific tropical waters. It is present in numerous regions, including East and South Africa, Madagascar, the Red Sea and the Persian Gulf, Maldives, eastern Polynesia, Galapagos, Clipperton and Cocos islands off Central America, southern Japan, Midway and Hawaii, and northern New South Wales and Lord Howe Island.

Habitat 
This cowrie lives in intertidal rocky areas and shallow tide pools among sea weed, coral remains, and empty bivalve shells. It can be found on and under rocks in shallow water and on exposed reefs at low tide. It feeds on algae and marine vegetation growing on loose rocks and pieces of dead coral.

Subspecies and forms
Subspecies:
 Monetaria moneta icterina (Lamarck, 1810)
 Monetaria moneta monetserpentis Lorenz, Chiapponi & Mont, 2012
 Monetaria moneta tuberculosa (Quoy & Gaimard, 1834)

 Monetaria moneta barthelemyi (f) Bernardi, M., 1861

Forms:
 Monetaria moneta form erosaformis
 Monetaria moneta form harrisi Iredale, T., 1939
 Monetaria moneta form icterina Lamarck, J.B.P.A. de, 1810
 Monetaria moneta form rhomboides Schilder, F.A. & M. Schilder, 1933
 Monetaria moneta form tuberculosa Quoy, J.R.C. & J.P. Gaimard, 1834

Human uses
The shell is used in jewelry and in other decorative items such as baskets and wall hangings.

As money

Shells of this cowrie were commonly used as a medium of exchange in many areas of Africa, Asia and the Pacific islands until the late 19th century.

The Maldives provided the main source of cowrie shells, throughout Asia and parts of the East African coast. Huge amounts of Maldivian cowries were introduced into Africa by slave traders.

It was also traded to Native Americans by European settlers.

For divination
The shell is still used in divination rituals in some African religions.

In the State of Kerala, in India, special money cowrie shells (which are known in Malayalam as  ) are used for divination as part of Hindu astrology, as Prashnam. For Prashnam, 108 shells of Monetaria moneta are rotated a number of times and the blessings of God and one's Guru are invoked. A portion of the Kavadis are separated and counted to find out the ruling planet at that time. The results of the Prasna horoscope (a horoscope formulated at the time of arrival of the persons) are compared with the results of the Prasnam, and the predictions are pronounced on that basis.

References

 Verdcourt, B. (1954). The cowries of the East African Coast (Kenya, Tanganyika, Zanzibar and Pemba). Journal of the East Africa Natural History Society 22(4) 96: 129-144, 17 pls.

External links
 On-line articles with Cypraea moneta in the HAWAIIAN SHELL NEWS (1960-1994)
 cypraea moneta
 More habitat info
 Shell money
 Astamangala Divya Prasna an article about divination in Kerala using coweries.
 

Cypraeidae
Fauna of Western Australia
Gastropods described in 1758
Taxa named by Carl Linnaeus